Kavand (also Romanized as Kāvand and Kāwand; also known as Kavyand) is a village in Bughda Kandi Rural District, in the Central District of Zanjan County, Zanjan Province, Iran. At the 2006 census, its population was 1,095, in 287 families.

References 

Populated places in Zanjan County